Russkaya Rech may refer to:

Russkaya Rech (Moscow magazine), published in Moscow by Evgenia Tur in 1861-1862
Russkaya Rech (Saint Petersburg magazine), published by Alexander Navrotsky in 1879-1882